Sarah Field Splint (1883–1959) was an American author, editor, domestic science consultant, and feminist.

Biography
Sarah Field Splint, of Swarthmore, Pennsylvania, was an alumnus of Colby College. From 1914 to 1919 she was the editor of the magazine "Today's Housewife", published in Cooperstown, New York. She served as chief of the Home Conservation Division of the Food Conservation Division of the United States Food Administration, designing the USFA uniform, later known as the Hoover apron. Splint was an editor of Woman's Home Companion, Managing Editor of The Woman's Magazine, and a member of the staff of The Delineator. She associated with feminist group, Heterodoxy, having favored suffrage. Splint donated to her alma mater's library a collection of the works of Sarah Orne Jewett. She died in 1959.

Selected works
 192?, The Rumford modern methods of cooking; delicious and savory dishes ...
 1922, Time-saving cookery
 1923, What you gain by using Dairylea milk : recipes and budget
 1925, Master-recipes : a new time-saving method of cookery : prepared in McCall's laboratory-kitchen, Sarah Field Splint, Director 
 1925, What to serve at parties : menus and recipes for parties of every kind : prepared in McCall's laboratory-kitchen, Sarah Field Splint, Director 
 1926, Pies and pastries : icings and frostings
 1926, The art of cooking and serving
 1926, Some hints on deep fat frying
 1926, Smoothtop cookery with gas, the modern fuel 
 1929, 199 selected recipes
 1930, Salads, suppers, picnics : a book of delicious and time saving dishes made with Premier Salad Dressing
 1930, A manual of cookery in 12 chapters as applied to classroom work
 1931, Table service and accessories
 1935, 65 prize recipes from the South : a collection of prize-winning recipes, proved favorites from Southern homes

References

Bibliography

1883 births
1959 deaths
American cookbook writers
American feminists
American magazine editors
American suffragists
Home economists
Women cookbook writers
Women magazine editors